Anderson Carvalho Trindade, commonly known as Anderson Pedra is a Brazilian footballer who plays as a defensive midfielder for Mixto.

Born in the Votuporanga, he started his career at Iraty.

He missed most of the 2014 season due to a serious knee injury.

Career statistics

(Correct )

Contract
 Grêmio Prudente.

References

External links
 ogol.com
 sambafoot
 soccerway

1983 births
Living people
People from Votuporanga
Brazilian footballers
Campeonato Brasileiro Série A players
Campeonato Brasileiro Série B players
Campeonato Brasileiro Série C players
Iraty Sport Club players
Mogi Mirim Esporte Clube players
Paulista Futebol Clube players
Santa Cruz Futebol Clube players
Grêmio Barueri Futebol players
Sport Club do Recife players
Atlético Clube Goianiense players
Clube Atlético Votuporanguense players
ABC Futebol Clube players
Mixto Esporte Clube players
Association football midfielders
Footballers from São Paulo (state)